Ana Konjuh was the defending champion but chose to compete in Madrid instead.

Anhelina Kalinina won the title, defeating Kamilla Rakhimova in the final, 6–1, 6–3.

Seeds

Draw

Finals

Top half

Bottom half

References

Main Draw

Zagreb Ladies Open - Singles
Zagreb Ladies Open